Body Rapture II is a various artists compilation album released in February 1992 by Zoth Ommog Records. Sonic Boom commended the series as a decent introduction to energetic electro acts burgeoning in the underground scene.

Track listing

Personnel
Adapted from the Body Rapture II liner notes.

 Sven Freuen – compiling
 LAW/L/AL – design
 Andreas Tomalla (as Talla 2XLC) – compiling

Release history

References

External links 
 Body Rapture II at Discogs (list of releases)

1992 compilation albums
Zoth Ommog Records compilation albums